Éric Babin (18 October 1959 – 11 January 2021) was a New Caledonian politician.

Biography
He was born in Nouméa. He served in the Congress of New Caledonia from 1995 to 1999 as a member of The Rally–UMP. He died on 11 January 2021, after a motorcycle accident.

References

1959 births
2021 deaths
People from Nouméa
Members of the Congress of New Caledonia
Motorcycle road incident deaths
The Rally (New Caledonia) politicians